Cymbium is a genus of sea snails, marine gastropod mollusks in the family Volutidae.

Distribution
All the species of this genus are restricted to Western Africa.

Species
Species within the genus Cymbium include:
 Cymbium coenyei Nolf, 2017
 Cymbium cucumis Röding, 1798
 Cymbium cymbium (Linnaeus, 1758)
 Cymbium fragile Fittkau & Stürmer, 1985
 Cymbium glans (Gmelin, 1791)
 Cymbium gracile (Broderip, 1830)
 Cymbium marmoratum Link, 1807
 Cymbium olla (Linnaeus, 1758)
 Cymbium pachyus (Pallary, 1930)
 Cymbium patulum (Broderip, 1830)
 Cymbium pepo (Lightfoot, 1786)
 Cymbium senegalense Marche-Marchad, 1978
 Cymbium souliei Marche-Marchad, 1974
 Cymbium tritonis (Broderip, 1830)
Species brought into synonymy
 Cymbium aethiopicum (Linnaeus, 1758): synonym of Melo aethiopicus (Linnaeus, 1758)
 Cymbium caputvelatum Bruynseels, 1975: synonym of Cymbium tritonis (Broderip, 1830) 
 Cymbium cisium Menke, 1828: synonym of Cymbium cymbium (Linnaeus, 1758) 
 Cymbium flammeum Röding, 1798: synonym of Melo amphora (Lightfoot, 1786) 
 Cymbium guttatum Röding, 1798: synonym of Cymbium pepo (Lightfoot, 1786) 
 Cymbium indicum (Gmelin, 1790): synonym of Melo melo (Lightfoot, 1786)
 Cymbium inflata Röding, 1798: synonym of Cymbium pepo (Lightfoot, 1786) 
 Cymbium jacobinum Röding, 1798: synonym of Cymbium cymbium (Linnaeus, 1758) 
 Cymbium maculatum Röding, 1798: synonym of Melo melo (Lightfoot, 1786)
 Cymbium melo (Lightfoot, 1786): synonym of Melo melo (Lightfoot, 1786)
 Cymbium navicula Gmelin, 1791: synonym of Cymbium pepo (Lightfoot, 1786)
 Cymbium neptuni Gmelin, 1791: synonym of Cymbium pepo (Lightfoot, 1786)
 Cymbium papillaris Gmelin, 1791: synonym of Cymbium pepo (Lightfoot, 1786)
 Cymbium papillatum Schumacher, 1817: synonym of Cymbium olla (Linnaeus, 1758) 
 Cymbium philipinum Röding, 1798:  synonym of Cymbium olla (Linnaeus, 1758)
 Cymbium praeputium Röding, 1798: synonym of Cymbium pepo (Lightfoot, 1786)
 Cymbium productum R. T. Lowe, 1861:  synonym of Cymbium olla (Linnaeus, 1758)
 Cymbium rubiginosum (R. T. Lowe, 1861): synonym of Cymbium cucumis Röding, 1798 
 Cymbium rubiginosum (Swainson, 1822): synonym of Cymbium cucumis Röding, 1798
 Cymbium unicolor Link, 1807: synonym of Cymbium cymbium (Linnaeus, 1758)

References

 Bail, P.; Poppe, G.T. (2001). A conchological iconography: a taxonomic introduction of the recent Volutidae. ConchBooks, Hackenheim. 30 pp, 5 pl.

External links
 Röding P.F. (1798). Museum Boltenianum sive Catalogus cimeliorum e tribus regnis naturæ quæ olim collegerat Joa. Fried Bolten, M. D. p. d. per XL. annos proto physicus Hamburgensis. Pars secunda continens Conchylia sive Testacea univalvia, bivalvia & multivalvia. Trapp, Hamburg. viii, 199 pp
 Marche-Marchad I. & Rosso J.C. 1978. Les Cymbium du Sénégal. Notes Africaines, 178: 1-19

Volutidae